Be Water is a documentary film that premiered at the 2020 Sundance Film Festival and is directed by Bao Nguyen. It is about Bruce Lee, a famous martial artist. It uses significant amounts of archival footage, and focuses on Lee's 2 years in Hong Kong spent filming 4 feature films. Reviewers think it is a compelling film. It is part of ESPN's 30 for 30 documentary series and the film tackles racism in America. In a GQ interview, Nguyen talks about how this film represents protest and fits the zeitgeist, with many more Asian-American films being released as contemporaries.
As of February 19, 2021, it is on Netflix.
It won the Gold List Award in 2021.

Reception

On Rotten Tomatoes, the film has an aggregate score of 93% based on 28 positive and 2 negative critic reviews. The website’s consensus reads: "If Be Water's surface level approach doesn't quite match its subject's depth, it still serves as an appropriate introduction to the almighty Bruce Lee."

References

30 for 30
2020 films
2020 documentary films
American sports documentary films
Films about Bruce Lee
2020s American films